Alexander Francis Macdonald (1818 – April 12, 1913) was a politician and railway contractor.

The son of Alexander Macdonald, he was educated in Cornwall and at St Raphael's College. He settled in Cornwall. Macdonald was president of the Canada Cotton Company. After being elected in the 1874 election on January 22, he was unseated by petition on September 7, 1874, and re-elected on October 20 the same year. Macdonald did not run in the 1878 election. His brothers, John Sandfield Macdonald and Donald Alexander Macdonald, were also Members of Parliament.

Macdonald never married. He died in Cornwall at the age of 95.

Electoral record 

On Mr. Macdonald being unseated on petition, 7 September 1874:

|}

References

External links

1818 births
1913 deaths
Liberal Party of Canada MPs
Members of the House of Commons of Canada from Ontario
Place of death missing